Mayet may refer to:

Mayet (ancient Egypt), an Ancient Egyptian mummy
Mayet, Sarthe, a commune of Sarthe, France
Mayet (surname), a surname

See also 
Maat, an Ancient Egyptian goddess